In molecular biology, the plant calmodulin-binding domain is a protein domain found repeated in a number of plant calmodulin-binding proteins. These domains are thought to constitute the calmodulin-binding domains of these proteins. Binding of the proteins to calmodulin depends on the presence of calcium ions. These proteins are thought to be involved in various processes, such as plant defence responses  and stolonisation or tuberization.

References

Protein domains